SunOS is a Unix-branded operating system developed by Sun Microsystems for their workstation and server computer systems. The SunOS name is usually only used to refer to versions 1.0 to 4.1.4, which were based on BSD, while versions 5.0 and later are based on UNIX System V Release 4, and are marketed under the brand name Solaris.

History

SunOS 1 only supported the Sun-2 series systems, including Sun-1 systems upgraded with Sun-2 (68010) CPU boards. SunOS 2 supported Sun-2 and Sun-3 (68020) series systems. SunOS 4 supported Sun-2 (until release 4.0.3), Sun-3 (until 4.1.1), Sun386i (4.0, 4.0.1 and 4.0.2 only) and Sun-4 (SPARC) architectures.  Although SunOS 4 was intended to be the first release to fully support Sun's new SPARC processor, there was also a SunOS 3.2 release with preliminary support for Sun-4 systems.

SunOS 4.1.2 introduced support for Sun's first sun4m-architecture multiprocessor machines (the SPARCserver 600MP series); since it had only a single lock for the kernel, only one CPU at a time could execute in the kernel.

The last release of SunOS 4 was 4.1.4 (Solaris 1.1.2) in 1994. The sun4, sun4c and sun4m architectures were supported in 4.1.4; sun4d was not supported.

Sun continued to ship SunOS 4.1.3 and 4.1.4 until December 27, 1998; they were supported until September 30, 2003.

"SunOS" and "Solaris"

In 1987, AT&T Corporation and Sun announced that they were collaborating on a project to merge the most popular Unix flavors on the market at that time: BSD (including many of the features then unique to SunOS), System V, and Xenix. This would become System V Release 4 (SVR4). 

On September 4, 1991, Sun announced that its next major OS release would switch from its BSD-derived source base to one based on SVR4.  Although the internal designation of this release would be SunOS 5, from this point Sun began using the marketing name Solaris. The justification for this new "overbrand" was that it encompassed not only SunOS, but also the OpenWindows desktop environment and Open Network Computing (ONC) functionality.

Even though the new SVR4-based OS was not expected to ship in volume until the following year, Sun immediately began using the new Solaris name to refer to the currently shipping SunOS 4 release (also including OpenWindows).  Thus SunOS 4.1.1 was rebranded Solaris 1.0; SunOS 5.0 would be considered a part of Solaris 2.0.  SunOS 4.1.x micro versions continued to be released through 1994, and each of these was also given a Solaris 1.x equivalent name.  In practice, these were often still referred to by customers and even Sun personnel by their SunOS release names. Matching the version numbers was not straightforward:

Today, SunOS 5 is universally known as Solaris, although the SunOS name is still visible within the OS itself in the startup banner, the output of the uname command, and man page footers, among other places.

Matching a SunOS 5.x release to its corresponding Solaris marketing name is simple: each Solaris release name includes its corresponding SunOS 5 minor version number. For example, Solaris 2.4 incorporated SunOS 5.4.  There is one small twist: after Solaris 2.6, the "2." was dropped from the Solaris name and the SunOS minor number appears by itself. The latest Solaris release is named Solaris 11 and incorporates SunOS 5.11.

User interface

GUI environments bundled with earlier versions of SunOS included SunTools (later SunView) and NeWS. In 1989, Sun released OpenWindows, an OPEN LOOK-compliant X11-based environment which also supported SunView and NeWS applications. This became the default SunOS GUI in SunOS 4.1.1.

See also
 Comparison of BSD operating systems
 Comparison of operating systems
 Illumos
 OpenSolaris
 OpenIndiana
 Solaris (operating system)
 Unix wars

References

External links
 The Sun Hardware Reference (Overview)
 
 An Introduction to Solaris – a sample chapter from Solaris Internals: Core Kernel Architecture by Jim Mauro & Richard McDougall, Prentice-Hall, 2000. (PDF)
 Info on SunOS from OSdata (last updated February 17, 2002)
 Initial Solaris announcement

Berkeley Software Distribution
Discontinued operating systems
Sun Microsystems software
UNIX System V